The Communauté de communes entre Seine et Forêt is a former federation of municipalities (communauté de communes) in the Seine-et-Marne département and in the Île-de-France région of France. It was created in December 2001. It was merged into the new Communauté d'agglomération du Pays de Fontainebleau in January 2017.

Composition 
The Communauté de communes comprised the following communes:
Héricy
Samoreau
Vulaines-sur-Seine

See also
Communes of the Seine-et-Marne department

References 

Former commune communities of Seine-et-Marne